This is a list of Zambian musicians/producers and musical groups.

Solo musicians
Alick Nkhata
B Flow
Ballad Zulu
Chef 187
Jordan Katembula
Just Slim
Larry Maluma
Lazarus Tembo
Leo "K'millian" Moyo
Lily Tembo
Macky 2
Maiko Zulu
Mampi
Nashil Pichen
OC Osilliation
Paul Ngozi
Roberto
Yvonne Mwale
Petersen Zagaze

Groups
Amayenge
Distro Kuomboka
Mashome Blue Jeans
Witch
Zone Fam

Zambian
musicians